Abdusalam Mohammed (Arabic:عبد السلام محمد) (born 19 June 1992) is an Emirati footballer who played in the Arabian Gulf League for Ittihad Kalba .

External links

References

Emirati footballers
1992 births
Living people
Al Ain FC players
Baniyas Club players
Al-Ittihad Kalba SC players
UAE Pro League players
Association football defenders